Eaton High School is a high school in Eaton, Colorado, United States. It is a part of the Eaton School District. They have a football team known as the Eaton Reds.

References

External links

High schools in Colorado
Schools in Weld County, Colorado